Condover railway station was located in the village of Condover, Shropshire.

Originally built by the Shrewsbury and Hereford Railway and opened in 1852, the station closed in 1958 but its line, the Welsh Marches Line, is still operational.

The station building is now a cattery and kennels.

References

Further reading

Railway stations in Great Britain opened in 1852
Railway stations in Great Britain closed in 1958
Disused railway stations in Shropshire
1852 establishments in England
Former Shrewsbury and Hereford Railway stations